For the aircraft Thulin Type B see:Thulin B (aircraft)

Thulin B or Thulin Type B was an automobile built by AB Thulinverken.

History 
In 1925 Thulinverken was contacted by the brothers Per and Hugo Weiertz (who earlier had worked on the Self) who wanted them to build a car using their own blueprints. Thulinverken became interested in the project and hired the two brothers. During 1926 a prototype was constructed and tested and during 1927 the car went into production. Only 13 cars were built and none of them remain today.

Sources 
https://web.archive.org/web/20070114070157/http://www2.landskrona.se/kultur/bilhistoria/pages/introb.html

Cars of Sweden